Dean Craig (born 25 October 1974) is an English screenwriter and film director.  In addition to his film work, Craig wrote the BBC television series Off The Hook.

Early life
He was educated at The Haberdashers' Aske's Boys' School, an independent school in Elstree in Hertfordshire.

Career
Craig began as a script reader and script editor for Working Title, BBC Films, and Miramax, before heading to New York University to take a summer filmmaking program in 2002. He wrote on his first feature screenplay Caffeine. He then wrote Death at a Funeral, which would later be remade in 2010.

He teaches screenwriting at the London Film School.

Filmography
The Honeymoon (2022) - Director/Writer
The Estate (2022) - Director/Writer
Love, Wedding, Repeat (2020) - Director/Writer
My Dog Stupid (2019) - Writer
Hit The Road (2017, TV series) - Writer
A Few Less Men (2017) - Writer
Carrie Pilby (2016) - Writer
Moonwalkers (2015) - Writer
A Few Best Men (2012) - Writer
Death at a Funeral (2010) - Writer
Off The Hook (2009, TV series) - Writer
Death at a Funeral (2007) - Writer
Caffeine (2006) - Writer

References

External links

People educated at Haberdashers' Boys' School
English screenwriters
English male screenwriters
English film directors
1974 births
Living people
Screenwriting instructors